Books LLC is an American publisher and a book sales club based in Memphis, Tennessee. Its primary work is collecting Wikipedia and Wikia articles and selling them as printed and downloadable books.

Print-on-demand and electronic products
Books LLC publishes print-on-demand paperback and downloadable compilations of English texts and documents from open knowledge sources such as Wikipedia. Books LLC's copies of the English Wikipedia are republished by Google Books. Titles are also published in French and German respectively under the names "Livres Groupe" and "Bücher Gruppe". Books' publications do not include the images from the original Web documents but, in their place, URLs pointing to the Web images. According to the FAQ page: “We understand how annoying that can be for the reader. But our first priority has to be respecting copyright laws. In addition, the resolution of the online photos are not high enough to print in a book.”

In 2009, Books LLC and its sister imprint General Books LLC produced 224,460 and 11,887 titles respectively.

Imprint and book club names
In brackets: kind of material published and sold.
 Books LLC or Books Group (English Wikipedia)
 General Books LLC (public domain material scanned and recognized by OCR)
 General Books Club (public domain material)
 Genbooks.net (public domain material)
 Million-books.com (public domain material)
 Rare Books Club (public domain material)
 Wiki Editions (public domain material and CC-BY-SA material)
 Livres Groupe (French Wikipedia)
 Bücher Gruppe (German Wikipedia)

See also 
Amazon.com controversies
OmniScriptum
Philip M. Parker
PediaPress

References

External links
 Debora Weber-Wulff: German Libraries Avoiding Fake Publishers. Copy, Shake, and Paste. A blog about plagiarism from a German professor, written in English.

Wikipedia
Book publishing companies based in Tennessee
Companies based in Memphis, Tennessee